Tetraiodobenzenes form a group of substances consisting of a benzene ring with four iodine atoms (-I) as substituents (C6H2I4). By their different arrangement, three constitutional isomers are possible.

References 

Iodoarenes